Wallace Ford Johnson (July 13, 1889 – February 15, 1971) of Philadelphia was an American tennis player in the early 20th century.

Career
Johnson played collegiate tennis at the University of Pennsylvania, where in 1909 he won NCAA championships in both singles, against Melville H. Long, and doubles.

At the U.S. National Championships, Johnson reached the singles final in both 1912 and 1921 before falling to future International Tennis Hall of Famers Maurice McLoughlin and Bill Tilden.  He also won U.S. mixed doubles championships in 1907, 1909, 1911, and 1920. All but his 1907 title came with Hazel Hotchkiss Wightman; the 1907 title was with May Sayers. Johnson was ranked the U.S. No. 4 in 1922 and World No. 8 in 1913 by Dr. E.B. Dewhurst.

He also played on the U.S. Davis Cup team in 1913 defeating the German Oskar Kreuzer in the semifinal round.

At the Cincinnati tournament, Johnson paired with Richard H. Palmer to win the doubles title in 1910 and reach the doubles final in 1911, and was a singles finalist in 1910 and a singles semifinalist in 1911.

Johnson coached the University of Pennsylvania men's tennis team from 1929 until 1959. Johnson also served as Penn's men's squash coach for 30 years (1929–54, 56–59) and guided LeRoy Lewis to the National Squash Championship in 1937 and 1938.

In 1999, Johnson was posthumously enshrined into the ITA Collegiate Tennis Hall of Fame, and in 2008 he was enshrined into the USTA/Middle States Section Hall of Fame.

Grand Slam finals

Singles

Runners-up (2)

Mixed doubles

Titles (4)

References

External links
ITA Men’s Collegiate Tennis Hall of Fame

American male tennis players
Penn Quakers men's tennis players
Tennis players from Philadelphia
United States National champions (tennis)
1889 births
1971 deaths
Grand Slam (tennis) champions in mixed doubles
Professional tennis players before the Open Era